Yeager is a mostly American surname, a phonetic transcription of the common German surname Jaeger (Jäger), meaning hunter. 

Notable people with the surname include:

Albert F. Yeager, (1892-1961) American horticulturalist
Biff Yeager, American actor
Bunny Yeager (1929–2014), American photographer and model
Chuck Yeager (1923–2020), American test pilot who was the first person to break the sound barrier
Dan Yeager (born 1965), American actor, screenwriter, and director
George Yeager (1874–1940), American baseball player
James J. Yeager (1909–1971), American football player and coach
Jeana Yeager (born 1952), American aviator
Joe Yeager (1875–1937), American baseball player
Ken Yeager (born 1952), American politician
Laura Yeager, American Army general
Leland Yeager (1924–2018), American economist
Lewis Yeager (1878–1906), American football coach
Mike Yeager (born 1977), American football coach
Ralph Oscar Yeager (1892–1960), German-American architect
Roy Yeager (born 1949), American musician
Stephanie Yeager, American politician
Steve Yeager (born 1948), American major league baseball catcher
Steve Yeager (filmmaker) (born 1948), American film director
William Yeager (born 1940), best known for his development of the first multiple-protocol router software while working at Stanford University

Fictional characters:
Eren Yeager, main character of the manga and anime Attack on Titan, also spelled Jaeger in some translations
Cade and Tessa Yeager, characters from Transformers: Age of Extinction
Charlotte E. Yeager, character from the anime Strike Witches, based on Chuck Yeager as her ace archetype. Also known as "Shirley".

See also
Jagger (disambiguation)
Jagr (disambiguation)
Jäger (disambiguation)
 Yaeger

English-language surnames
Americanized surnames